The 2011 Cincinnati Bearcats football team represented the University of Cincinnati as a member of the Big East Conference during the 2011 NCAA Division I FBS football season. The Bearcats were led by second-year head coach Butch Jones and played their home games at Nippert Stadium and two conference games at Paul Brown Stadium. They finished the season 10–3 overall and 5–2 in Big East play to share the conference championship with Louisville and West Virginia. Despite the conference title, which was their third in the last four years, they did not receive the conference's automatic bid into a BCS game (West Virginia received the bid based on BCS rankings). They were invited to the Liberty Bowl where they defeated Vanderbilt 31–24.

Schedule

Roster

Rankings

Game summaries

Louisville

Awards and milestones

Big East Conference honors
Offensive Player of the Year: Isaiah Pead
Defensive Player of the Year: Derek Wolfe
Coach of the Year: Butch Jones

Big East Conference All-Conference First Team

Isaiah Pead, RB
Alex Hoffman, OL

Derek Wolfe, DL
J.K. Schaffer, LB
Pat O'Donnell, P

Big East Conference All-Conference Third Team

Anthony McClung, WR

Walter Stewart, DL
Dan Giordano, DL
Camerron Cheatham, DB

Players in the 2012 NFL Draft

References

Cincinnati
Cincinnati Bearcats football seasons
Big East Conference football champion seasons
Liberty Bowl champion seasons
Cincinnati Bearcats football